Lira is a city in the Northern Region of Uganda. It is the main municipal, administrative, and commercial centre of Lira District.

History 
Lira was one of the last towns in Uganda held by loyalists of Idi Amin during the Uganda–Tanzania War (1978–1979). A force consisting of the Tanzania People's Defence Force's 201st Brigade and the Uganda National Liberation Front's Kikosi Maalum attacked Lira on 15 May 1979, ousting the Amin loyalists after a short battle. The clash at Lira was the last important battle of the Uganda–Tanzania War, as the remnants of Amin's army completely disintegrated thereafter.

Location

The coordinates of Lira City are 2°14'50.0"N 32°54'00.0"E (Latitude:02.2472; Longitude:32.9000).

Population
The 2002 national census estimated the population of Lira at 80,900. In 2010, the Uganda Bureau of Statistics (UBOS) estimated the population at 105,100. In 2011, UBOS estimated the mid-year population at 108,600. In August 2014, the national population census put the population at 99,059.

Transport
Lira is served by a railway station of the Uganda Railways network. The city is also served by a public civilian airport, Lira Airport, administered by the Civil Aviation Authority of Uganda.

Power line

An  132 kilovolt electricity line from the Karuma Power Station is under construction to a substation in Lira, under the supervision of Intec Gopa International Energy Consultants GmbH of Germany.

Points of interest
The following additional points of interest lie within the town limits or close to the edges of the city:
 Offices of Lira City Council
 Lira Main Market
 Ngetta Rock
 Mount Meru Millers 
 Mukwano Industries Lira factory
 Lira University, a public university in Uganda
 Lira Campus of Uganda Martyrs University, a private university, whose main campus is located in Nkozi, Mpigi District
 All Saints University, a private university affiliated with the Church of Uganda
 A branch of the National Social Security Fund
 Ministry of Water and Environment Upper Nile region branch
 Lira Integrated School, a mixed, residential, nursery, primary and secondary school
 Secondary schools include the following public schools: Lango College, Comboni College, Dr. Obote College, St. Katherine Girls School.
 Lira Town College, a secondary school
Accommodation facilities include Good news hotel, Lira Hotel, Pacific Grand Hotel, Pauline Hotel and several others. 
A golf course next to Lira Central Primary School
Lira regional referral hospital, a government facility

Notable people
David Oyite Ojok, former major general, liberator and UNLA Chief of Staff
Dusman Sabuni, military officer and rebel leader
Milton Obote, 2nd President of Uganda

See also
Lango people
Lira University

References

Works cited

External links
Quick facts on Lira Town and Uganda

Populated places in Northern Region, Uganda
Cities in the Great Rift Valley
Lango sub-region